John Owen Stone  (born 31 January 1929) is a former Australian public servant and politician. He was Secretary to the Treasury between 1979 and 1984, and a senator for Queensland, representing the National Party, from 1987 to 1990.

Early life
Stone was born on 31 January 1929 in Perth, Western Australia. After gaining first class honours in mathematical physics for his bachelor of science degree and representing his state at hockey (under 21), he was selected as the Rhodes Scholar from Western Australia for 1951. At Oxford he was awarded first class honours in Philosophy, Politics and Economics (PPE) and won the James Webb Medley Prize for Economics.

Public service career
In 1954, Stone returned to Australia and joined the Treasury. He rose within the Treasury department to become Secretary during the period of the Fraser government. He penned a severe critique of Fraser's economic policies, which was used against the Liberal Party once the Australian Labor Party won the 1983 federal election.  He supported some of the Hawke-Keating government's economic reforms, although he had little time for Bob Hawke or Paul Keating personally.  While his resignation from the Treasury did not become effective until 14 September 1984, he announced his imminent departure on 15 August 1984, just six days before the 1984–85 Budget was handed down. That was seen by commentators at the time as a strongly adverse comment on the government's direction.

Despite holding what were seen by some to be neoliberal economic views, Stone initially opposed the decision in December 1983 to float the Australian dollar, and consistently deplored a consumption tax. In fact, after it was introduced, he repeatedly denounced the GST, and then–Treasurer Peter Costello.

Politics
An informal advisor to Queensland's longest-serving premier, Sir Joh Bjelke-Petersen, Stone was elected to the Australian Senate at the 1987 election representing Queensland, as a member of the pro-Bjelke-Petersen National Party. John Howard, Liberal Party leader at the time, appointed Stone as the Opposition finance spokesman. Following the release of the Coalition's One Australia immigration policy in 1988, Stone said: "Asian immigration has to be slowed. It's no use dancing around the bushes."

In 1990, Stone left the Senate and contested the House of Representatives seat of Fairfax, his Senate place being taken by Bill O'Chee. Unsuccessful in his attempt to win Fairfax, he abandoned parliamentary life but remained very much in the public eye.

Later activities
After 1990, Stone was an outspoken critic of multiculturalism and a supporter of the Samuel Griffith Society, which he helped found. He had a column on economics and politics in The Australian Financial Review. Other Australian publications for which he wrote include The Sydney Morning Herald, the quarterly National Observer, and Quadrant. Stone was critical of the Howard Government for eroding the power of the states within the Australian federal system, regarding that as a departure from the long-standing Liberal/National coalition support for "states' rights". However, in an article published in the March 2008 issue of Quadrant, Stone argued that Howard had been Australia's greatest Prime Minister.

In June 2022, Stone was appointed Officer of the Order of Australia in the 2022 Queen's Birthday Honours for "distinguished service to the people and Parliament of Australia, and to public administration".

Notes

References

Australian Rhodes Scholars
Living people
1929 births
Members of the Australian Senate for Queensland
Members of the Australian Senate
National Party of Australia members of the Parliament of Australia
Officers of the Order of Australia
People educated at Perth Modern School
Politicians from Perth, Western Australia
Secretaries of the Department of the Treasury of Australia
University of Western Australia alumni
20th-century Australian politicians
Quadrant (magazine) people